Nhlanhla Dlamini (born 4 January 1998) is a South African cricketer. He made his List A debut on 6 October 2019, for KwaZulu-Natal in the 2019–20 CSA Provincial One-Day Challenge.

References

External links
 

1998 births
Living people
South African cricketers
KwaZulu-Natal cricketers
Place of birth missing (living people)